In 1975, Andy Warhol created a series of 250 screenprints based on pop-culture icon Mick Jagger. Warhol had created past album covers for the Rolling Stones when he did the cover for Sticky Fingers. Andy had Jagger pose in 10 different positions to create 10 sets of 25 screenprints for a total of 250 pieces. The catalogue is titled Mick Jagger Portfolio FS II.138-147, and the pieces are done on Arches Aquarelle paper.

References 

Andy Warhol